The 2022 PGA Championship was a professional golf tournament, held May 19–22 at Southern Hills Country Club in Tulsa, Oklahoma. It was the 104th PGA Championship. This was the fifth PGA Championship at Southern Hills and its eighth major championship. The event was originally scheduled to be played at Trump National Golf Club Bedminster in New Jersey, but was moved to Southern Hills following the January 6 storming of the US Capitol.

Defending champion Phil Mickelson withdrew from the tournament amid controversy over his remarks about LIV Golf. It was the first time he had missed the PGA Championship since 1992, and the first time the defending champion did not play since 2008, when Tiger Woods was sidelined after knee surgery.

Justin Thomas defeated Will Zalatoris in a three-hole aggregate playoff to win his second PGA Championship (2017). Thomas came from seven shots behind at the start of the final round to win, tying the largest comeback in PGA Championship history. Mito Pereira, the 54-hole leader in his first PGA Championship appearance, led by one shot playing the 72nd hole before hitting his drive into a water hazard and making a double-bogey to finish a shot out of the playoff.

This was the first major championship to go to a playoff since the 2017 Masters, a span of 19 consecutive majors, the longest in history.

This year's purse was increased 25% to $15 million, with a winner's share of $2.7 million.

Venue

Course Layout

Southern Hills had previously hosted the PGA Championship in 1970, 1982, 1994, and 2007; it also hosted the U.S. Open in 1958, 1977, and 2001.

Field
The field for the PGA Championship is sometimes regarded as the strongest in professional golf, routinely having the highest "strength of field rating" of the year according to the Official World Golf Ranking. A number of qualification criteria are used to determine the field, which includes past PGA champions, recent major winners, top finishers in the 2021 PGA Championship, Ryder Cup players, tournament and leading money winners on the PGA Tour, and twenty PGA club or teaching professionals. The PGA of America also issue invitations to players outside of these criteria, which is generally seen to include the top-100 in the world rankings.

Criteria
This list details the qualification criteria for the 2022 PGA Championship and the players who qualified under them; any additional criteria under which players qualified is indicated in parentheses.

1. All past winners of the PGA Championship (list excludes those not expected to play)

Rich Beem
Keegan Bradley (10)
John Daly
Jason Day
Jason Dufner
Pádraig Harrington (8)
Martin Kaymer
Brooks Koepka (3,8,10,11,12)
Rory McIlroy (5,10,11,12)
Shaun Micheel
Collin Morikawa (4,8,10,11,12)
Justin Thomas (5,10,11,12)
Tiger Woods (2)
Yang Yong-eun

Davis Love III, Phil Mickelson (8,10), Vijay Singh, and Jimmy Walker did not play.

2. Recent winners of the Masters Tournament (2018–2022)

Dustin Johnson (10,11)
Hideki Matsuyama (10,12)
Patrick Reed (10)
Scottie Scheffler (8,10,11,12)

3. Recent winners of the U.S. Open (2017–2021)

Jon Rahm (8,10,11,12)
Gary Woodland (10)

Bryson DeChambeau (10,11) did not play.

4. Recent winners of The Open Championship (2016–2021)

Shane Lowry (8,10,11)
Francesco Molinari
Jordan Spieth (10,11,12)
Henrik Stenson

5. Recent winners of The Players Championship (2019–2022)

Cameron Smith (10,12)

6. Winner of the 2020 Olympic Games

Xander Schauffele (10,11,12)

7. Current Senior PGA Champion

Alex Čejka

8. The leading 15 players, and those tying for 15th place, in the 2021 PGA Championship

Abraham Ancer (10,12)
Tony Finau (10,11,12)
Rickie Fowler
Harry Higgs
Louis Oosthuizen (10)
Justin Rose
Kevin Streelman
Will Zalatoris (10)

 Paul Casey (10,11) did not play.

9. The leading 20 players in the 2022 PGA Professional Championship

Alex Beach
Brandon Bingaman
Michael Block
Matt Borchert
Tyler Collet
Paul Dickinson
Tim Feenstra
Austin Hurt
Colin Inglis
Nic Ishee
Jared Jones
Sean McCarty
Kyle Mendoza
Jesse Mueller
Dylan Newman
Zac Oakley
Casey Pyne
Ryan Vermeer
Shawn Warren
Wyatt Worthington II

10. Top 70 from special money list on the PGA Tour from the 2021 AT&T Byron Nelson to the 2022 Wells Fargo Championship

Daniel Berger (11)
Sam Burns (12)
Patrick Cantlay (11,12)
Cameron Champ (12)
Corey Conners
Cameron Davis (12)
Matt Fitzpatrick (11)
Lucas Glover (12)
Talor Gooch (12)
Branden Grace
Adam Hadwin
Brian Harman
Tyrrell Hatton (11)
Russell Henley
Lucas Herbert (12)
Garrick Higgo (12)
Tom Hoge (12)
Max Homa (12)
Billy Horschel
Viktor Hovland (11,12)
Mackenzie Hughes
Matt Jones
Kim Si-woo
Kevin Kisner (12)
Jason Kokrak (12)
Anirban Lahiri
Lee Kyoung-hoon (12)
Marc Leishman
Luke List (12)
Maverick McNealy
Troy Merritt
Keith Mitchell
Sebastián Muñoz
Kevin Na
Joaquín Niemann (12)
Alex Norén
Séamus Power (12)
Adam Scott
J. J. Spaun (12)
Sepp Straka (12)
Hudson Swafford (12)
Cameron Tringale
Erik van Rooyen (12)
Harold Varner III
Jhonattan Vegas
Aaron Wise
Cameron Young

Harris English (11,12) and Im Sung-jae (12) did not play.

11. Playing members of the 2021 Ryder Cup teams, who are ranked within the top 100 on the Official World Golf Ranking as of May 9, 2022

Tommy Fleetwood
Sergio García
Ian Poulter
Lee Westwood
Bernd Wiesberger

12. Winners of official tournaments on the PGA Tour from the 2021 PGA Championship until the start of the championship

Ryan Brehm
Chad Ramey

13. PGA of America invitees

Adri Arnaus
Oliver Bekker
Christiaan Bezuidenhout
Richard Bland
Dean Burmester
Laurie Canter
Stewart Cink
Ryan Fox
Justin Harding
Nicolai Højgaard
Sam Horsfield
Rikuya Hoshino
Yuki Inamori
Zach Johnson
Sadom Kaewkanjana
Takumi Kanaya
Kim Bi-o
Chan Kim
Tom Kim
Ryosuke Kinoshita
Chris Kirk
Jinichiro Kozuma
Pablo Larrazábal
Min Woo Lee
Robert MacIntyre
Shaun Norris
Carlos Ortiz
Ryan Palmer
Mito Pereira
Thomas Pieters
Webb Simpson
Daniel van Tonder
Bubba Watson

Kazuki Higa was invited but did not play.

14. If necessary, the field is completed by players in order of PGA Championship points earned (per 10)

Lanto Griffin
Matt Kuchar
Patton Kizzire
Matthew Wolff
Davis Riley

Alternates who gained entry (per category 14):
Brendan Steele (78)
Beau Hossler (79)
Kramer Hickok (80)
Charl Schwartzel (81)
Adam Schenk (84)
Russell Knox (85)
Scott Stallings (86)
Joel Dahmen (87)
Denny McCarthy (89)

Round summaries

First round
Thursday, May 19, 2022

Two-time champion Rory McIlroy shot 65 (−5), his lowest round in his PGA Championship career, to take a one-shot lead over Tom Hoge and Will Zalatoris. Beginning his round on the 10th hole, McIlroy birdied four holes in a row on his first nine and did not make a bogey until the sixth hole, his 15th. He finished the round by making an 18-foot putt for birdie on the ninth, taking the first-round lead at a major championship for the first time since the 2014 Open Championship and first after any round since winning the 2014 PGA Championship.

Hoge made only one bogey to go with five birdies, while Zalatoris birdied three of his first four holes to equal Hoge's four-under 66. 2017 champion Justin Thomas was even-par making the turn after bogeys on holes eight and nine before making three birdies on the back-nine to shoot 67 (−3), the lowest score in the afternoon.

World No. 1 and Masters champion Scottie Scheffler eagled the par-5 fifth hole to go two-under on his round but made four bogeys on the back-nine to finish with a one-over 71. Tiger Woods was two-under through five holes before making seven bogeys the rest of his round, finishing at four-over 74.

Second round
Friday, May 20, 2022

Will Zalatoris shot a bogey-free round of 65 (−5) to take a one-shot lead over Mito Pereira at nine-under. Zalatoris birdied three holes in a row on his back-nine to get to eight-under for the tournament. At the par-4 17th hole, after his drive went into the trees to the right of the fairway, Zalatoris hit his approach to seven feet and made the putt for sole possession of the 36-hole lead.

Pereira, playing in just his second major championship and first PGA Championship, was two-under on his round at the turn before making four birdies on his second nine. He had a six-foot birdie putt on the ninth (his 18th) to shoot 63 but missed, settling for a six-under 64 to finish at eight-under.

Playing in the more difficult morning conditions, Justin Thomas birdied the ninth (also his 18th) for a second consecutive round of 67 (−3). At six-under for the tournament, he held the lead as he finished his round before being passed by Zalatoris and Pereira in the afternoon.

Bubba Watson made nine birdies in a tournament-record round of 63 (−7), narrowly missing a 22-foot putt on the 18th for the first 62 in PGA Championship history. He was the third player to shoot 63 in a major at Southern Hills, along with Raymond Floyd in 1982 and Tiger Woods in 2007. He finished at five-under and in fourth place.

Overnight leader Rory McIlroy made two bogeys on the front-nine and didn't make a birdie until the 12th, settling for a one-over 71 to fall back to a tie for fifth place at four-under. Woods, in the same group with McIlroy, double-bogeyed the 11th hole after hitting a chip shot over the green into a bunker to fall to five-over and outside the cutline, but he rebounded with birdies at the 13th and 16th to finish at three-over and make the cut by two shots.

The 36-hole cut came at 144 (+4) and better; 79 players advanced to the weekend. Notables to miss the cut included World No. 1 Scottie Scheffler, the reigning Masters champion, and two-time major champion Dustin Johnson.

Third round
Saturday, May 21, 2022

Mito Pereira, in his PGA Championship debut, shot a one-under 69 to take a three-shot lead into the final round. Beginning the round a shot behind Will Zalatoris, Pereira birdied two of his first five holes and opened up as much as a four-shot lead on the front-nine before three consecutive bogeys from holes 8 to 10. 

He rebounded with a 17-foot birdie putt on the par-5 13th, then hit his approach on the par-3 14th to six feet for another birdie. He finished the round by making a 27-foot putt for birdie on the 18th green to finish at nine-under for the tournament. He became the first player to lead after 54 holes in his tournament debut since John Daly in 1991.

Zalatoris, the overnight leader, bogeyed four holes on his front-nine, including a three-putt on the par-3 sixth hole. He made his first birdie on the round on the 13th, holing a 35-foot putt. After a bogey on the 16th when he could not advance his ball out of the right rough off the tee, he hit his second on the par-4 17th inside four feet for a birdie to climb back to six-under for the tournament, three shots back of Pereira.

Matt Fitzpatrick and Cameron Young both shot 67 (−3) to climb into contention. Fitzpatrick birdied four of his last 10 holes, including both 17 and 18, to join Zalatoris at six-under and a tie for second place. Young drove the green on the 17th and made a 24-foot putt for eagle to finish at five-under and alone in fourth place.

2017 champion Justin Thomas began the round in third place but shot 74 (+4) to fall seven shots off the lead at two-under. Two-time champion Rory McIlroy also shot 74, including a triple-bogey at the 11th; he finished at even-par. Bubba Watson was alone in second place while playing the front-nine but went four-over on the back-nine to join a group tied for seventh place at two-under.

Tiger Woods shot a nine-over 79, including a stretch of five bogeys in a row for the first time in his major championship career, before withdrawing from the tournament after the round.

Final round
Sunday, May 22, 2022

Summary
Will Zalatoris, beginning the round three shots behind Mito Pereira, tied the lead with two birdies in his first five holes while Pereira was one-over. Zalatoris made bogey on the par-3 sixth hole after hitting his approach over the green into thick bushes and taking a drop on the cart path, then failed to get up-and-down from a greenside bunker on the seventh for another bogey as Pereira again went three ahead with a birdie at the fifth hole. Pereira bogeyed both the seventh and eighth holes but managed to save par from a bunker on the ninth to make the turn at seven-under, one shot ahead of Zalatoris and Cameron Young.

Zalatoris bogeyed the 12th, while Young tied Pereira at six-under when the leader also bogeyed the hole. Pereira reached the green on the par-5 13th hole in two shots and two-putted for birdie, while Young fell two behind after hitting his tee shot on the par-3 14th into a bunker. Young three-putted for a double-bogey on the 16th and finished the round at four-under following a 71. Pereira's tee shot on the 14th flew over the green and he made another bogey, dropping his lead again to just one shot. Zalatoris also three-putted for bogey on the 16th before holing a seven-foot birdie putt at the 17th to reach five-under.

While the leaders were struggling, Justin Thomas, who began the round seven shots behind, was quickly moving up the leaderboard. He birdied the ninth hole, then made a 64-foot putt from the front of the 11th green for another birdie. He made his second consecutive birdie on the 12th hole to reach four-under, then got up-and-down from a bunker on the short 17th for another birdie that moved him to five-under. At the 18th, he hit his approach to 10 feet but missed the birdie putt, settling for a par and a three-under round of 67.

Zalatoris made an eight-foot par putt on the 18th to tie Thomas for the clubhouse lead at five-under. Leading by one playing the 18th, Pereira hit his drive to the right into a water hazard, found the rough on his third shot, then chipped over the green. He suffered a double-bogey on the hole, dropping down to four-under and a shot out of the playoff.

Final leaderboard

Scorecard

Cumulative tournament scores, relative to par
{| class="wikitable" span = 50 style="font-size:85%"
|-
|style="background: Red;" width=10|
|Eagle
|style="background: Pink;" width=10|
|Birdie
|style="background: PaleGreen;" width=10|
|Bogey
|style="background: Green;" width=10|
|Double Bogey
|}

Playoff
After both Thomas and Zalatoris birdied the par-5 13th hole to begin the playoff, Thomas drove the green on the 17th and two-putted for birdie while Zalatoris settled for par. When Zalatoris missed a lengthy birdie putt on the 18th, Thomas needed only to two-putt for par to win his second major title, both at the PGA Championship.
Thomas' seven-shot comeback after 54 holes tied John Mahaffey in 1978 for largest in PGA Championship history.

Scorecard

Notes

References

External links

Coverage on the PGA Tour's official site
Coverage on the European Tour's official site

PGA Championship
Golf in Oklahoma
PGA Championship
PGA Championship
PGA Championship
PGA Championship